The 2018 Toronto Argonauts season was the 61st season for the team in the Canadian Football League and their 146th season overall. The Argonauts failed to improve upon their 9–9 record from 2017, losing their tenth game of the season to the Calgary Stampeders on September 28. Following their week 17 loss to the BC Lions on October 6, 2018, the Argonauts were the first team eliminated from post-season contention. They became the first team since the 2006 Edmonton Eskimos to fail to qualify for the playoffs in the year after winning the Grey Cup. 

This was the second season with Jim Popp as general manager and Marc Trestman as head coach. It was announced the day following the Argonauts 24-9 loss to the Ottawa Redblacks on November 2 that Trestman would be relieved of his coaching duties for the Toronto Argonauts football team, following a 4-14 season with minimal success in Ricky Ray's absence.  Ricky Ray was also indecisive about retirement at the end of the 2018 CFL regular season after sustaining a season-ending injury in the Argonauts 41-7 loss to the Calgary Stampeders on June 23 though he ultimately retired prior to the start of the 2019 Toronto Argonauts season.

Offseason

CFL draft 
The 2018 CFL Draft took place on May 3, 2018. The Argonauts had the last selection in each round of the draft by virtue of winning the 105th Grey Cup, less any traded picks. The Argos traded their third-round pick to the Winnipeg Blue Bombers in a trade for Drew Willy, but got Edmonton's when the Argos traded Mason Woods for James Franklin. The Argonauts also made two conditional trades, one of which was fulfilled; they lost their sixth-round selection to Montreal after acquiring S. J. Green and he had a successful season.

Preseason 
The Argonauts played their home pre-season game in Guelph due to field maintenance for the grass at their usual home stadium, BMO Field.

 Games played with white uniforms.

Regular season 
The Toronto Argonauts lost their starting quarterback, Ricky Ray, due to a serious neck injury in the team's 41–7 loss to the Calgary Stampeders in the second week of the season. He was subsequently discharged from a Toronto hospital several days later. At the time of discharge, it was announced that Ray would miss a significant, but undisclosed, amount of time from on-field responsibilities. At the time of injury, commentators suggested that the team bench Ray in favor of their newly acquired backup quarterback, James Franklin.

Standings

Schedule 

 Games played with colour uniforms.
 Games played with white uniforms.

Team

Roster

Coaching staff

References

External links
 

Toronto Argonauts seasons
2018 Canadian Football League season by team
2018 in Toronto